Why Smith Left Home is a 1919 American silent film farce directed by Donald Crisp and starring Bryant Washburn. Famous Players-Lasky produced the film with distribution through Paramount Pictures. This film is based on the turn of the century play, Why Smith Left Home, by George Broadhurst. The play starred Maclyn Arbuckle in the Washburn role.

An incomplete copy of Why Smith Left Home is held at the Library of Congress.

Cast
Bryant Washburn as John Brown Smith
Lois Wilson as Marian
Mayme Kelso as Aunt Mary
Winter Hall as The General
Walter Hiers as Bob White
Margaret Loomis as Julie
Carrie Clark Ward as Lavina

References

External links

1919 films
American silent feature films
American films based on plays
Paramount Pictures films
Films directed by Donald Crisp
1919 comedy films
Silent American comedy films
American black-and-white films
1910s American films